Flapper is a vehicle for hire company headquartered in Belo Horizonte, Brazil. Flapper operates a private aviation marketplace which provides per-seat bookings as well as whole aircraft charters.

Company history
Flapper was established in early 2016. The idea of an "Uber of Executive Aviation" was conceived of by Sergey Terentyev (CEO Qiwi), Arthur Vizin, Iago Senefonte, and William Oliveira, all employees of NASDAQ listed fintech Qiwi, who together founded the company with CEO Paul Malicki.

Brazilian startup accelerator ACE was the first to inject resources into Flapper, and in the middle of 2018 other investors, including Brazilian fund manager Confrapar, led its seed investment. As of December 2018, the company has accrued  million in funding.

Operations

Booking platform
A passenger can book a seat through a smartphone app, which also enables users to charter an entire plane or helicopter on demand. Users select their departure and destination, number of seats, travel time and the best time for flights. Users can also check each aircraft's certificates of airworthiness and maintenance, verify their aeronautical and civil liability insurance, and verify each company's certification by the National Civil Aviation Agency of Brazil.

In mid-2018, Malicki reported that Flapper’s per-seat booking revenue on shared flights provided about 50 percent of its revenue at that time, with charters providing the rest. Flapper generates about 80 percent of its revenue from its mobile-device app.

Payments
Users can pay via credit card and have the option to break the payment into three installments.

Future plans
In October 2018 it was reported that Flapper is planning on adding electric helicopters to its flight sharing service, predicted to begin in 2021.

References

Airlines of Brazil
Airlines established in 2016
Charter airlines